Min Sithu (also Sithu Nge; died 1485) was Viceroy of Toungoo from 1481 to 1485.

He inherited the viceroyship after his father Sithu Kyawhtin of Toungoo was killed in battle in 1481. He was killed by his nephew Mingyi Nyo. The viceroy had repeatedly refused the nephew's requests to marry his daughter Soe Min (Mingyi Nyo's first cousin). He was a grandson of Crown Prince Minye Kyawswa of Ava.

References

Bibliography
 

Rulers of Toungoo
1485 deaths
Year of birth unknown